Vanj District or Nahiya-e Vanj is a district in eastern Tajikistan, in the north-west of the Gorno-Badakhshan Autonomous Region, with administrative capital Vanj.

It is located east of the river Panj at the point where the Panj turns from north to west. It is roughly rectangular, tending to the southwest. It is bounded on the west by the Panj and Afghanistan, on the northwest by Darvoz District, on the north by the Darvoz Range and Farkhor District of Khatlon Region, on the east (approximately) by the Academy of Sciences Range and Murghob District and on the south by the Yazgulem Range and Rushon District.  It corresponds to the valleys of the rivers Vanj (north) and Yazgulem (south), separated by the Vanj Range. The population of Vanj District is 34,400 (1 January 2020 estimate).

Administrative divisions 
They are as follows:

References

Districts of Tajikistan
Gorno-Badakhshan Autonomous Region